"Ever Blazin'" is the second international single from Jamaican rapper Sean Paul's third studio album, The Trinity (2005).

Release and reception
"Ever Blazin'" was released in the UK on 28 November 2005 as the second single from "The Trinity". In France, it was the first single from the album to chart. The track re-united Sean Paul with award-winning producer Steven 'Lenky' Marsden, who produced "Get Busy". Lenky's 'Masterpiece' riddim provided the backdrop for Sean to testify about a "never ending" love.

"Ever Blazin'" had its highest peak in France,  8. However, in the UK, it became his first solo single to miss the top 10 since the first release of "Gimme the Light" made No. 32 in 2002. This could be attributed, perhaps to the fact the song was relatively a few years old compared to other tracks on the album. Despite spending two months inside the top 75, it remained his lowest chart peak there until July 2006 when "Never Gonna Be the Same" failed to make the top 20.

Track listings
UK - CD: 1
 "Ever Blazin'" 
 "Get with It Girl" (Non-Album Track)

UK - CD: 2
 "Ever Blazin'"
 "Get with It Girl" (Non-Album Track) 
 "Feel Alright" (Non-Album Track)
 "Ever Blazin'" (Video) 
 Ringtone

Charts

Weekly charts

Year-end charts

References

2005 singles
2005 songs
Atlantic Records singles
Music videos directed by Anthony Mandler
Sean Paul songs
Song recordings produced by Steven "Lenky" Marsden
Songs written by Sean Paul
Songs written by Steven "Lenky" Marsden
VP Records singles